Eickendorf may refer to the following places in Saxony-Anhalt, Germany:

Eickendorf, Salzlandkreis
Eickendorf, Börde